Artur Nikolayevich Chilingarov (born 25 September 1939) is an Armenian-Russian polar explorer. He is a corresponding member of the Russian Academy of Sciences, he was awarded the title of Hero of the Soviet Union in 1986 and the title of Hero of the Russian Federation in 2008. He is the president of State Polar Academy. Chilingarov is a member of the United Russia party; he was a member of the State Duma from 1993 to 2011, and again from 2016 onwards and was the representative of Tula Oblast in the Federation Council between 2011 and 2014.

Biography 
Chilingarov was born in Leningrad to Russian mother and Armenian father. His father was born in Gyumri (Leninakan) and moved to Vladikavkaz at a young age.

In 1963, he graduated from the Arctic faculty of the S.O. Makarov Leningrad Maritime Institute.  As an engineer-oceanographer, he was directed to the Tiksi observatory of the Arctic and Antarctic Research Institute. In 1965, he was elected first secretary of the Bulun Komsomol district committee.
In 1969, he was appointed  head of the drift ice station “North Pole-19” and, in 1971, Chilingarov headed the Bellingshausen Station of the 17th Soviet Antarctic Expedition.

Between 1974 and 1979, he worked in the Western sector of the Arctic as head of the Amderma Administration of hydrometeorology and environmental control. Under his direction, new forms of Arctic operative navigation support were implemented; for the first time, experimental work on cargo transfers to fast ice during wintertime were carried out in the Yamal Peninsula. Chilingarov summarized his experience in navigation support on the Northern Sea Route in his dissertation for the scientific degree of a kandidat of geographical sciences.

In 1985, he headed the special expedition on the research vessel Mikhail Somov, which was ice-blocked in the Southern Ocean. For successful performance of the rescue operations in extreme conditions and for displayed organizational abilities and courage, Chilingarov was awarded the title of Hero of the Soviet Union on 14 February 1986.

In January 2002, he led an expedition to the South Pole along with 14 other tourists on an Antonov An-3 biplane. When a mechanical problem grounded the aircraft at the South Pole, Chilingarov and other VIPs were flown by American Hercules LC130 aircraft to McMurdo and then onward to Christchurch. The rest of the group arranged a pick-up from Adventure Network International, who operate tourist flights to the South Pole.
In January 2007, he led a helicopter expedition to Antarctica, he was joined by FSB chief Nikolay Patrushev and visited the South Pole and Amundsen-Scott station.

During the 2007 Russian North Pole expedition, Chilingarov, accompanied by five other explorers from different countries, descended on 2 Mir submersibles to the seabed 13,980 feet below the North Pole in order to plant the Russian flag there and gather specimens of the seabed. In regard to the territorial claims in the Arctic, Chilingarov was quoted as saying, "The Arctic is Russian. We must prove the North Pole is an extension of the Russian landmass".

In July 2008, Russia announced it was sending Mir submersibles to descend one mile to the bottom of Lake Baikal to conduct geological and biological tests on its unique ecosystem. Chilingarov is scheduled to join in 60 dives in total.  On 29 July 2008, Chilingarov took part in a dive to a depth of 1,580 meters in Lake Baikal, just short of the record 1,637 meters.

On 10 January 2008, Chilingarov was awarded the title of Hero of the Russian Federation for "courage and heroism displayed in extreme conditions and for the successful completion of the High-Latitude Arctic Deep-Water Expedition."

In August 2009, he revealed a planned Arctic expedition for April 2010. Chilingarov plans to fly on dirigible AU-30, manufactured by the Aeronautic Centre Avgur.

In December 2012, Chilingarov supported the anti-Magnitsky bill to ban U.S. adoptions of Russian orphans, although he said earlier that there was no need to rush the legislation: "It concerns children, and you have to be accurate with it”

Awards 

 Hero of the Russian Federation (9 January 2008) – for courage and heroism displayed in extreme conditions, and the success of high-latitude Arctic expedition
 Hero of the Soviet Union (14 February 1986) – for exemplary performance targets for the release of the research vessel Mikhail Somov from the ice of Antarctica, leadership in rescue operations during the period of drift and displaying courage and heroism
 Order of Merit for the Fatherland, 3rd class (12 June 2007) – for active participation in legislative activities and the success of high-latitude air expedition to South Pole
 Order of Naval Merit (27 January 2003) – for outstanding contribution to research, development and use of the oceans
 Order of Lenin
 Order of the Red Banner of Labour
 Order of the Badge of Honour
 Honoured meteorologist of the Russian Federation (11 February 2005)
 USSR State Prize – for the development of methods of cargo handling on fast ice in Yamal
 Order of Polar Star (Yakutia, 25 November 2002)
 Order of St. Mashtots (Armenia, 17 September 2008) – in connection with the 17th anniversary of the independence of the Republic of Armenia
 Commander of the Order of Bernardo O'Higgins (Chile, 2006)
 Order of Friendship (South Ossetia), (19 June 2009) – for his great contribution to strengthening friendship and cooperation between peoples, actively promote the development of democracy and parliamentarianism in the Republic of South Ossetia and to provide practical assistance to its citizens in the implementation of voting rights
 Chevalier Legion of Honour (France, 2010)
 Medal of Anania Shirakatsi (Armenia, 31 October 2000) – for his contribution to the strengthening and development of Armenian-Russian friendship
 Order of St. Prince Daniil Moskovsky, 2nd class (Russian Orthodox Church, 2009) – in consideration of the works, for their active participation in the development of church life and in connection with the 70th anniversary of the birth
 Medal "Symbol of Science" (2007)

Chilingarov is the author of more than 50 scientific publications. He was elected into all the State Dumas and served as Deputy Chairman of the Third State Duma.

References

External links
 Biography of Chilingarov

1939 births
Living people
Chevaliers of the Légion d'honneur
Corresponding Members of the Russian Academy of Sciences
Heroes of the Russian Federation
Heroes of the Soviet Union
Russian geographers
Members of the Federation Council of Russia (after 2000)
Scientists from Saint Petersburg
Recipients of the Order of Friendship (South Ossetia)
Recipients of the Order of Lenin
Recipients of the Order "For Merit to the Fatherland", 3rd class
Russian and Soviet polar explorers
Russian people of Armenian descent
Soviet Armenians
Recipients of the USSR State Prize
Recipients of the Order of Naval Merit (Russia)
Recipients of the Medal "For Distinction in Guarding the State Border of the USSR"
Commandeurs of the Légion d'honneur
21st-century Russian politicians
First convocation members of the State Duma (Russian Federation)
Second convocation members of the State Duma (Russian Federation)
Third convocation members of the State Duma (Russian Federation)
Fourth convocation members of the State Duma (Russian Federation)
Fifth convocation members of the State Duma (Russian Federation)
Seventh convocation members of the State Duma (Russian Federation)
Eighth convocation members of the State Duma (Russian Federation)